Killmatic is an album by the American hip hop collective Demigodz, released in 2013 by Version Records. It was produced by rapper Apathy (who also serves as executive producer for the album), DJ Premier, Teddy Roxpin, Chumzilla (who also serves as disc jockey for three songs), Snowgoons, Skammadix, Will C, and Marco Polo.

Pre-release
On November 23, 2011, Celph Titled from Demigodz shared the first single, "Demigodz Is Back" from the Demigodz album entitled as Killmatic on Facebook. The official video of "Demigodz Is Back" was later released on January 18, 2013. The second single was released on February 5, 2013 called "Dead in the Middle".

Release
The album debuted at No. 11 on the Billboard Heatseekers Albums chart.

Post-release
The third single called "Worst Nightmare" was released on the same day as the album, March 5, 2013. The fourth and final single, "Raiders Cap", was released on May 13, 2013.

Description
"Demigodz is for true, hardcore hip-hop fans", Apathy said. "This Killmatic album was made to reflect that. We always try to keep it grimy, dirty, creepy, spooky and fucked up".

Reception
Killmatic received critical acclaim from music critics. Jake Paine of HipHopDX gave the album a 3.5 out of 5 saying "If the title was any indication, Killmatic merges two things—seedy subject matter and Golden-Era style. References to David Berkowitz, porn runaways, dirty apartments and more litter this album" and "The other ‘Godz are role-players within an album that doesn’t focus on concept nearly as much as style. To some, this is Everyman music from artists with the antithesis of Everyman abilities."

D.T. Swinga of HipHopSite gave the album a 4 out of 5 saying "The who-gives-a-fuck mentality of Killmatic comes through in both its brazen lyrical content and its flagrant sample selection. The lyrical content is a contest of jabs, designed to shock the listener and instigate friendly competition within the crew." And that "As hip-hop music continues to deteriorate into something only used to sell bottles (whether it be champagne or soda), it’s nice to see a crew of dudes like Demigodz still holding it down after a decade plus in the game, especially when many of the cats that came up in their era have more or less hung up their mics."

Credits
Cover [Illustration] by Chris Murray
Design [Graphics] by Open Mic
Executive Produced by Apathy, Celph Titled & Open Mic
Recorded by DJ Premier (track 8)
Recorded and mixed by Apathy
Vocals [skit] by Adrienne Law

Track listing

Charts

References

2012 albums
Hip hop albums by American artists